Supreme Blientele is the second studio album by American rapper Westside Gunn from Buffalo, New York. It was released on June 22, 2018 through Griselda Records with distribution by Empire Distribution. Its titles allude to Ghostface Killah's album Supreme Clientele and the Canadian professional wrestler Chris Benoit. Production was handled by Daringer, The Alchemist, Pete Rock, Harry Fraud, Sadhugold, Roc Marciano, Statik Selektah, 9th Wonder and Nephew Hesh. The album includes guest appearances from Anderson .Paak, Benny the Butcher, Bro AA Rashid, Busta Rhymes, Conway the Machine, Crimeapple, Elzhi, Keisha Plum, Jadakiss and Roc Marciano.

Track listing

Chart history

References

External links

Supreme Blientele by Westside Gunn on iTunes

2018 albums
Albums produced by 9th Wonder
Albums produced by Harry Fraud
Albums produced by Pete Rock
Albums produced by Roc Marciano
Albums produced by Statik Selektah
Albums produced by the Alchemist (musician)
Albums produced by Daringer (producer)
Hip hop albums by American artists
Empire Distribution albums
Griselda Records albums